Bukin is a Russian masculine surname, its feminine counterpart is Bukina. It may refer to

Andrei Bukin (born 1957), Russian ice dancer 
Ekaterina Bukina (born 1987), Russian wrestler
Ivan Bukin (born 1993), Russian ice dancer, son of Andrei
Tanatkan Bukin (born 1967), Russian Paralympic sitting volleyball player

See also
 , Japanese coin in Edo period feudal Japan
 Mladenovo, Serbian village also known as Bukin
 Baqin, old name for this Syrian village